Svetoslav Kovachev (Bulgarian: Светослав Ковачев; born 14 March 1998) is a Bulgarian professional footballer who plays as a winger for Arda Kardzhali.

His younger brother Lachezar is also a footballer, currently playing for Levski Lom.

Career

Ludogorets Razgrad
Born in Pleven, Kovachev started his career in Svoboda Milkovitsa. He joined Ludogorets in 2011 recruited by the Bulgarian legend Plamen Getov. In 2014, he played for Ludogorets U19 in the UEFA Youth League, being a starter in all of the 6 matches.

He made his debut for Ludogorets Razgrad II on 6 December 2015 in a match against FC Pirin Razlog.

On 22 May 2016 he made his complete debut in A Group for Ludogorets in a match against Beroe Stara Zagora.

Kovachev started the 2017-18 season in Ludogorets II by scoring a goal in the first match of the season against Lokomotiv 1929 Sofia. On 29 July 2017 he played for the main team in the 0-0 draw against Lokomotiv Plovdiv coming as a substitute in the First League match. Kovachev was on the bench for the Europa League group stage match against İstanbul Başakşehir, but stayed as an unused substitute. On 21 September 2017 he made his debut for the Bulgarian Cup in the first round against Oborishte.

Kovachev was named captain for the Ludogorets U19 team in the UEFA Youth League in the first match from the Domestic Champions Path against Željezničar U19 on 27 September 2017.

On 15 February 2018 Kovachev was named on bench for the Europa League Round of 32 match against Milan and made his debut as a substitute in the 81st minute.

Loan to Dunav
In June 2018, Kovachev was loaned to Dunav Ruse, although he spend the pre-season camp with Ludogorets first team. He made his debut for the team in the first league match of the season against Vitosha Bistritsa on 20 July 2018, assisting for the only goal for Dunav.

On 4 November 2018 he scored his first goal for the team in First League, netting the second goal for the 3:0 win over Vitosha Bistritsa.

Arda Kardzhali
Kovachev joined Arda Kardzhali on a year long loan on 6 January 2020. He returned to Ludogorets team in end of December 2020, having a contract with Razgrad team until July 2021, which he didn't extend. In February 2021 he signed a 3 year pre-contract with Arda, from July 2021, leaving him out of Ludogorets team until end of the season.

International career

Youth levels
Kovachev was called up for the Bulgaria U19 team for the 2017 European Under-19 Championship qualification from 22 to 27 March 2017. After a draw and 2 wins the team qualified for the knockout phase which will be held in July 2017.

Kovachev made his debut for Bulgaria U21 on 27 March 2018 in a European Undr-21 qualification match against Kazakhstan U21, keeping a clean sheet for the 3:0 win.

Senior
Kovachev received his first call-up for senior Bulgarian squad on 29 August 2018 for the UEFA Nations League matches against Slovenia and Norway on 6 and 9 September. He earned his first cap on 26 February 2020, coming on as a substitute for Ismail Isa during the second half of the 0:1 home loss against Belarus in a friendly game.

Career statistics

Club

National team

References

External links
 

1998 births
Living people
Bulgarian footballers
Bulgaria international footballers
Bulgaria youth international footballers
Bulgaria under-21 international footballers
First Professional Football League (Bulgaria) players
Second Professional Football League (Bulgaria) players
PFC Ludogorets Razgrad II players
PFC Ludogorets Razgrad players
FC Dunav Ruse players
SFC Etar Veliko Tarnovo players
FC Arda Kardzhali players
Association football wingers
Sportspeople from Pleven